Nordjyske Jernbaner (abbreviated NJ) is a Danish railway company operating in Region Nordjylland. The company was formed in 2001 as a merger of Hjørring Privatbaner (HP) and Skagensbanen (SB). Headquartered in Hjørring, the company is responsible for running the former HP and SB lines, i.e., Hjørring–Hirtshals and Frederikshavn–Skagen, respectively. From 2017 and onwards, they started running trains from Skørping to Lindholm on the Aalborg Nærbane line.

See also
Rail transport in Denmark

External links

References

Railway companies of Denmark
Companies based in Hjørring Municipality
Railway companies established in 2001
2001 establishments in Denmark